The number needed to treat (NNT) or number needed to treat for an additional beneficial outcome (NNTB) is an epidemiological measure used in communicating the effectiveness of a health-care intervention, typically a treatment with medication. The NNT is the average number of patients who need to be treated to prevent one additional bad outcome (e.g. the number of patients that need to be treated for one of them to benefit compared with a control in a clinical trial).
 This calculation implicitly assumes monotonicity, that is, no individual can be harmed by treatment. The modern approach, based on counterfactual conditionals, relaxes this assumption and yields bounds on NNT.

A type of effect size, the NNT was described in 1988 by McMaster University's Laupacis, Sackett and Roberts. The ideal NNT is 1, where everyone improves with treatment and no one improves with control. A higher NNT indicates that treatment is less effective.

NNT is similar to number needed to harm (NNH), where NNT usually refers to a therapeutic intervention and NNH to a detrimental effect or risk factor. A combined measure, the number needed to treat for an additional beneficial or harmful outcome (NNTB/H), is also used.

Relevance
The NNT is an important measure in pharmacoeconomics. If a clinical endpoint is devastating enough (e.g. death, heart attack), drugs with a high NNT may still be indicated in particular situations. If the endpoint is minor, health insurers may decline to reimburse drugs with a high NNT. NNT is significant to consider when comparing possible side effects of a medication against its benefits. For medications with a high NNT, even a small incidence of adverse effects may outweigh the benefits. Even though NNT is an important measure in a clinical trial, it is infrequently included in medical journal articles reporting the results of clinical trials. There are several important problems with the NNT, involving bias and lack of reliable confidence intervals, as well as difficulties in excluding the possibility of no difference between two treatments or groups.

NNT may vary substantially over time, and hence convey different information as a function of the specific time-point of its calculation. Snapinn and Jiang  showed examples where the information conveyed by the NNT may be incomplete or even contradictory compared to the traditional statistics of interest in survival analysis. A comprehensive research on adjustment of the NNT for explanatory variables and accommodation to time-dependent outcomes was conducted by Bender and Blettner, Austin, and Vancak et al.

Explanation of NNT in practice

There are a number of factors that can affect the meaning of the NNT depending on the situation. The treatment may be a drug in the form of a pill or injection, a surgical procedure, or many other possibilities. The following examples demonstrate how NNT is determined and what it means. In this example, it is important to understand that every participant has the condition being treated, so there are only "diseased" patients who received the treatment or did not. This is typically a type of study that would occur only if both the control and the tested treatment carried significant risks of serious harm, or if the treatment was unethical for a healthy participant (for example, chemotherapy drugs or a new method of appendectomy - surgical removal of the appendix). Most drug trials test both the control and the treatment on both healthy and "diseased" participants. Or, if the treatment's purpose is to prevent a condition that is fairly common (an anticoagulant to prevent heart attack for example), a prospective study may be used. A study which starts with all healthy participants is termed a prospective study, and is in contrast to a retrospective study, in which some participants already have the condition in question. Prospective studies produce much higher quality evidence, but are much more difficult and time-consuming to perform.

In the table below:
 is the probability of seeing no improvement after receiving the treatment (this is 1 minus the probability of seeing improvement with the treatment). This measure applies only to the treated group.
 is the probability of seeing no improvement after receiving the control (this is 1 minus the probability of seeing improvement with only the control).  This measure applies only to the control (unexposed) group. The control group may receive a placebo treatment, or in cases where the goal is to find evidence that a new treatment is more effective than an existing treatment, the control group will receive the existing treatment. The meaning of the NNT is dependent on whether the control group received a placebo treatment or an existing treatment, and, in cases where a placebo treatment is given, the NNT is also affected to the quality of the placebo (i.e. for participants, is the placebo completely indistinguishable from the tested treatment.

Real-life example 
ASCOT-LLA manufacturer-sponsored study addressed the benefit of atorvastatin 10 mg (a cholesterol-lowering drug) in patients with hypertension (high blood pressure) but no previous cardiovascular disease (primary prevention). The trial ran for 3.3 years, and during this period the relative risk of a "primary event" (heart attack) was reduced by 36% (relative risk reduction, RRR). The absolute risk reduction (ARR), however, was much smaller, because the study group did not have a very high rate of cardiovascular events over the study period: 2.67% in the control group, compared to 1.65% in the treatment group. Taking atorvastatin for 3.3 years, therefore, would lead to an ARR of only 1.02% (2.67% minus 1.65%). The number needed to treat to prevent one cardiovascular event would then be 98.04 for 3.3 years.

Numerical example

Modern Approach to NNT
The above calculations for NNT are valid under monotonicity, where treatment can't have a negative effect on any individual. However, in the case where the treatment may benefit some individuals and harm others, the NNT as defined above cannot be estimated from a Randomized Controlled Trial (RCT) alone. The inverse of the absolute risk reduction only provides an upper bound, i.e., .

The modern approach defines NNT literally, as the number of patients one needs to treat (on the average) before saving one. However, since "saving" is a counterfactual notion (a patient must recover if treated and not recover if not treated) the logic of counterfactuals must be invoked to estimate this quantity from experimental or observational studies. The probability of "saving" is captured by the Probability of Necessity and Sufficiency (PNS), where
. However, due to the counterfactual nature of PNS, only bounds can be computed from an RCT, rather than a precise estimate. Tian and Pearl have derived tight bounds on PNS, based on multiple data sources, and Pearl showed that a combination of observational and experimental data may sometimes make the bounds collapse to a point estimate. Mueller and Pearl provide a conceptual interpretation for this phenomenon and illustrate its impact on both individual and policy-makers decisions.

See also
Population Impact Measures
Number needed to vaccinate
Number needed to harm

References

External links
Number Needed to Treat (NNT) Calculator
EBEM's Calculator for NNT

Drug discovery
Epidemiology
Medical statistics